Saint Patrick's Oratory is a Roman Catholic oratory located in Green Bay, Brown County, Wisconsin, United States, in the Roman Catholic Diocese of Green Bay.

Description
The oratory is under the care of the Institute of Christ the King Sovereign Priest.  The current rector is Canon Antoine Boucheron, who replaced Canon Denis Bucholz in the Spring of 2016.

Notes

Churches in the Roman Catholic Diocese of Green Bay
Churches used by the Institute of Christ the King Sovereign Priest
Buildings and structures in Green Bay, Wisconsin
Churches in Brown County, Wisconsin